Talk to Me is a 1996 made-for-TV drama film directed by Graeme Campbell and starring Yasmine Bleeth and Ricky Paull Goldin. The film aired on the ABC network.

Plot

Diane Shepherd is an idealistic talk-show producer, who is conscience-stricken, when she clashes with her ratings-obsessed and ruthless talk-show executive boss. Diane is forced to produce a tantalizing program about a prostitute which
potentially harms the prostitute, who is trying to turn her life around.

Kelly Reilly is a teenaged mother whose life is exposed on The Howard Grant Show. Kelly desperately wants to lead a normal life, but society is
dragging her back down.

Cast
 Yasmine Bleeth as Diane Shepherd
 Jenny Lewis as Kelly Reilly
 Peter Scolari as Howard Grant
 Ricky Paull Goldin as Dwayne
 Veronica Hamel as Sadie
 Brenda Devine as Jeri Lonigan
 Dawn Greenhalgh as Brenda Reilly
 Robin Brille as Lucille-Ann
 Dorion Davis as Krystal
 Tracy Dawson as Thelma
 Heather Dick as Kathleen 
 Terri Drennan as Bo-Peep
 D. Garnet Harding as Alan
 Kate Hennig as Stacy
 Karen Hines as Myra
 Lisa Hynes as Wanda	
 Martin Julien as Randy
 Brian Kaulback as Cameraman
 Scott Wickware as Bill
 Mairlyn Smith as Lana
 Laina Timberg as Joey
 R.D. Reid as Vernon
 Martin Roach as Alex
 Cliff Saunders as Chyron
 Alison Sealy-Smith as Miriam
 Shakura S'Aida as Scarecrow
 James Kidnie as Redneck
 Walter Alza as Pusher		
 Suzanne Coy as Prostitute
 Dominic Cuzzocrea as The Driver
 Reg Dreger as Manager #2
 Sam Malkin as The Director
 Ralph Small as Manager #1
 Jeff Topping as Son
 Anne Wessels as Elegant Woman
 Louis Wrightman as Junkie

Production credits

Graeme Campbell (Director)
Dan Bronson (Writer)
Steve White (Executive Producer)
Jim Lichtenstein (Co-Executive Producer)
John Perrin Flynn (Producer)
Megan Callaway	(Co-producer)

External links
imdb link

1996 television films
1996 drama films
1996 films
Films directed by Graeme Campbell (director)
American drama television films
1990s English-language films
1990s American films